The 2017 TaxSlayer Bowl was a post-season American college football bowl game played on December 31, 2017, at EverBank Field in Jacksonville, Florida. The 73rd edition of the Gator Bowl featured the Louisville Cardinals of the Atlantic Coast Conference against the Mississippi State Bulldogs of the Southeastern Conference. It was one of the 2017–18 bowl games that concluded the 2017 NCAA Division I FBS football season.  The game's naming rights sponsor was tax preparation software company TaxSlayer, and for sponsorship reasons was officially known as the TaxSlayer Bowl.

Teams

Louisville

Mississippi State

Game summary

Scoring summary

Statistics

References

TaxSlayer Bowl
Gator Bowl
Louisville Cardinals football bowl games
Mississippi State Bulldogs football bowl games
TaxSlayer Bowl